Hard Road to Travel is a song by Jimmy Cliff. It gave its name to a 1967 album of the same name and appeared on Cliff's next two albums, "Can't Get Enough Of It" and Jimmy Cliff. In addition, it was featured as the B-side to his singles I Got A Feeling (I Can't Stop) and Wonderful World, Beautiful People.

Rachel K Collier cover version
When Hard Road to Travel was covered by Rachel K Collier, it made #79 on the UK Singles Chart after being featured in a QualitySolicitors advert.

References

1967 songs
2012 singles
Song recordings produced by Leslie Kong
Trojan Records singles